Schwarzsee is a lake in the canton of Fribourg, Switzerland.

Schwarzsee may also refer to:

Austria
Schwarzsee (Kitzbühel), a moor lake in Tyrol
Schwarzsee (Zillertaler Alpen), a lake in Tyrol

Switzerland
Schwarzsee (Blatten), a lake in the canton of Valais
Schwarzsee (Davos), a lake at Davos-Laret in the Grisons
Schwarzsee (Oberems), a lake in the canton of Valais
Schwarzsee (Pizol), a lake on the Pizol, canton of St. Gallen
Schwarzsee (Zermatt), a lake above Zermatt, Valais
Lac de Tracouet (also Lac Noir), a lake above Nendaz, Valais

See also
Black Lake (disambiguation)
Schwarzer See (disambiguation)